Strummin' with the Devil: The Southern Side of Van Halen is a tribute album released on June 6, 2006. It features artists (including original Van Halen frontman David Lee Roth) performing covers of Van Halen songs of the Roth era, done in bluegrass style music. Roth appeared on several late night talkshows to promote the album.

Track listing
All songs written by Michael Anthony, David Lee Roth, Eddie Van Halen and Alex Van Halen, except 11 written by John Brim.

Chart performance

References

2006 compilation albums
David Lee Roth
Van Halen
Bluegrass compilation albums
Country rock compilation albums
Blues rock compilation albums
Tribute albums